Jorge Colome Jaime (born February 16, 1958) is a Cuban sprint canoer who competed in the early 1980s. At the 1980 Summer Olympics in Moscow, he was eliminated in the repechages of the K-1 500 m and the K-1 1000 m events.

References
Sports-Reference.com profile

1958 births
Canoeists at the 1980 Summer Olympics
Cuban male canoeists
Living people
Olympic canoeists of Cuba
20th-century Cuban people